Boothsdale is a village in Cheshire, England. It is part of the civil parish of Willington.

Villages in Cheshire